Max Hobart is an American conductor and violinist.  He is currently the Musical Director of the Wellesley Symphony Orchestra and was formerly the music director of the Boston Civic Symphony.

Originally from Nebraska, Hobart grew up in Bell Gardens, California where he learned to play the violin.  He later had private study with guitarist John Williams.  Orchestras he has played with include the New Orleans Symphony, the National Symphony Orchestra, the Cleveland Orchestra and the Boston Symphony Orchestra.

References

External links
The Official YouTube Channel of Boston Civic Symphony

American male conductors (music)
Year of birth missing (living people)
Living people
People from Bell Gardens, California
21st-century American conductors (music)
21st-century American male musicians